Dan Wood is an English broadcaster, DJ, podcaster and video producer.

Background 
Wood studied New Media Production and English Language at the University of Lincoln while pursuing a career in broadcasting, website creation and DJ work.

Career 
Wood has worked as an on-air radio personality for several UK radio networks including Global Radio and Bauer Media since 2001.  He currently presents the weekday mid-morning show on Gem 106 in the East Midlands and programmes on the Free Radio network.

Previously, Wood presented 'Music On Demand' a daily nationally syndicated programme across 38 radio stations on GCap Media's The One Network from 2007-2009, along with regular shows on GWR FM and Red Dragon FM. He was also heard on various Emap Radio stations in the 2000s, including Viking FM, Radio Aire, Metro Radio, The Hits Radio and Heat radio.  Dan also hosted the syndicated Floorfillers dance music show and was involved in the accompanying compilation CD albums.

Dan hosted and mixed the syndicated weekly 'Dan Wood In The Mix' radio show from 2008-2013 which aired on radio stations around the world including Rapture Radio, SS Radio Deep & Soulful, Gaydio, and Pure Dance. Dan's radio journery began on 8 January 2008 being a presenter on Heart East Midlands hosting Saturdays 9pm-12am and Sundays 3-5pm. In June 2012 Dan began covering Monday-Friday 3am-6am on Sam FM and in November 2013 He started to move stations as he Hosted Hits Radio Overnights from 1-6am Monday-Friday. He left on 31 October 2014 and from 1 June 2015 hosted Gem Daytimes first from 11am-4pm then from 2 January 2020 10am-2:30pm. From 8 March 2020 he started hosting Sunday Afternoons from 12pm-4pm. From 5 January 2019 Wood hosted Saturday Night Gem Anthems from 8pm-12am

Outside of radio broadcasting, Wood produces video and audio content relating to technology, video games and computers.  He presented videos for Channel Flip and Chris Pirillo's Lockergnome network from 2007-2010, as well as his own technology focused Youtube channel.

In 2010 Wood co-hosted the Logic Weekly podcast with Craighton Miller, a weekly technology news summary and discussion show.

He currently co-hosts The Retro Hour podcast with Ravi Abbott, a weekly audio podcast focussing on the history of video games and personal computers.  The podcast has interviewed many industry veterans including Tom Kalinske, John Romero, Richard Garriott and The Oliver Twins.  Wood and Abbott regularly host the podcast live at events such as PLAY Expo Manchester and Blackpool.

Wood founded a network of music websites under the Mirrorball brand from 1996-2001 which received coverage in Mixmag and 7 Magazine

His passion for electronic music, mainly house and UK garage saw him hold weekly and guest residencies at various bars and clubs across Yorkshire and the Midlands, including fronting his own night under the Mirrorball brand, a chain of Bodymoves UK garage nights and supporting DJ EZ and the Dreem Teem on various tours and dates.

Wood is currently working with Commodore UK's former Managing Director David Pleasance on a book, audio book and Blu-ray video detailing the inside happenings at the home computer company.

In June 2017, Wood joined the team at Friend Software Labs as Media Manager UK and presents their weekly Friend UPdate videos and tutorials.

References

Living people
English DJs
British broadcasters
Year of birth missing (living people)
Alumni of the University of Lincoln